Adrienn is a Hungarian feminine given name which may refer to:

 Adrienn Bende (born 1985), Hungarian racing driver and model
 Adrienn Csőke (born 1973), Hungarian Woman International Master (chess)
 Adrienn Hegedűs (born 1977), Hungarian former tennis player
 Adrienn Henczné Deák (1890–1956) was a Hungarian painter
 Adrienn Hormay (born 1971), Hungarian fencer
 Adrienn Kocsis (born 1973), Hungarian-born Peruvian former badminton player
 Adrienn Nagy (born 2001), Hungarian tennis player
 Adrienn Nyeste (born 1978), Hungarian gymnast
 Adrienn Orbán (born 1986), Hungarian handballer
 Adrienn Szarka (born 1991), Hungarian handballer
 Adrienn Tóth (born 1990), Hungarian pentathlete
 Adrienn Varga (born 1980), Hungarian former artistic gymnast

See also
 Adrienne
 Adrianne

Hungarian feminine given names